The 1978 All-Ireland Minor Hurling Championship was the 48th staging of the All-Ireland Minor Hurling Championship since its establishment by the Gaelic Athletic Association in 1928.

Kilkenny entered the championship as the defending champions.

On 3 September 1978 Cork won the championship following a 1-15 to 1-8 defeat of Kilkenny in the All-Ireland final. This was their 13th All-Ireland title and their first in four championship seasons.

Results

Munster Minor Hurling Championship

Final

All-Ireland Minor Hurling Championship

Semi-final

Final

External links
 All-Ireland Minor Hurling Championship: Roll Of Honour

Minor
All-Ireland Minor Hurling Championship